Jon Myong-hui (born 7 August 1986) is a female North Korean football goalkeeper.

She was part of the North Korea women's national football team at the 2008 Summer Olympics.

See also
 North Korea at the 2008 Summer Olympics

References

External links
 

usatoday
andymead.photoshelter
Getty Images

1986 births
Living people
North Korean women's footballers
Place of birth missing (living people)
Footballers at the 2008 Summer Olympics
Olympic footballers of North Korea
Women's association football goalkeepers
Asian Games medalists in football
Footballers at the 2006 Asian Games
North Korea women's international footballers
2007 FIFA Women's World Cup players
Asian Games gold medalists for North Korea
Medalists at the 2006 Asian Games